Geoffrey Green OBE (12 May 1911 – 9 May 1990) was an English football writer. Geoffrey Green was educated at Shrewsbury School, where he played football. He started writing about football for The Times in the 1930s. He is considered to be the godfather of football reporting, although he remained anonymous in the paper until 23 January 1967. He also broadcast on football for BBC Radio.

Green was appointed Member of the Order of the British Empire (MBE) in the 1946 Birthday Honours, and promoted to Officer (OBE) in the 1976 New Year Honours.

Match of the Century
Most noteworthy of his work was covering the "Match of the Century" on 25 November 1953, wherein Hungary beat England by the 6-3 scoreline under the heading "A New Conception of Football". It was England's first defeat at Wembley, and the inventors of football were described by him as "strangers in a strange world." 

The best goal of the game was scored by Ferenc Puskas; having received the ball from Czibor on the right near the six-yard box when the England captain Billy Wright went towards him for the tackle, Puskas drew the ball back as Wright charged past "like a fire engine going to the wrong fire" leaving the Hungarian captain free to score from his powerful left-foot.

Green retired from The Times in 1976 after nearly 40 years of distinguished service.

Inspired by Manchester United
Newspapers were printed out of Manchester until the late 1960s and coincidentally Sir Matt Busby's Manchester United were pioneering the cause to inject youth into football thereby creating a family atmosphere in the stands and no wonder that Green like many of his peers who frequented there, became inspired by their young, precocious team. The chief reason for being captivated was the healthy line of talented young players who came through the Youth Academy at Manchester United - Duncan Edwards, Sir Bobby Charlton and George Best. And it was Geoffrey Green who saw these three popular players in their prime.

Reported on perhaps one of the greatest games ever played in the FA Cup where Manchester United beat Aston Villa 6–4 in a 3rd round match  '""They thought as one man and moved as one at top speed.

Green was one of a very few journalists to have seen, up close, the player called Duncan Edwards, to whom he devoted an entire chapter in his book Soccer in The Fifties. "His talent, his energy, his unselfconscious fun and enjoyment of the chase, his ability to make everything seem possible, all this added up to a volcano of excitement that gripped the crowds and the game wherever he played".

Of significance to Manchester United supporters, Green captured the arrival of George Best against Benfica in the 1966 European Cup quarter-final in a splendid form "Night a star was born", wherein he described Best's goal as "gliding like a dark ghost past three men, to break clear and slide the ball home - a beautiful goal." Quintessential Best as The Beatle who "was the best of all, as he set a new almost unexplored beat" with his "long dark mop of hair, is known in these parts as The Beatle."

Books
 The Official History of the FA Cup (1949)
 History of The Football Association (1953)
 Soccer in The Fifties
 There's Only One United (1978)
 Pardon me for living  (autobiography)

References

1911 births
British association football commentators
1990 deaths
British sportswriters
British male journalists
The Times people
Officers of the Order of the British Empire